Diego Sebastián Aravena Ramírez (born December 30, 1996) is a Chilean footballer who currently plays as central midfielder for club Audax Italiano.

Career statistics

Club

Notes

References

External links
 

Living people
1996 births
Chilean footballers
Magallanes footballers
Deportes Magallanes footballers
Coquimbo Unido footballers
Audax Italiano footballers
Association football midfielders
Primera B de Chile players
Chilean Primera División players